Ruth Acuff is an American singer-songwriter, harpist, and rock musician.

Early life 
Ruth was born in Columbia, Missouri.  She is married to bass player and luthier Jeff Mueller from Mexico, Missouri.  She has performed at venues in Missouri and nationally on tour.  She now resides in New York City.   She is paternally related to country music singer Roy Acuff.

Performing groups and related artists 
Ruth performs in the following bands as the lead singer and performer:

Ruth Acuff:  A self-named "indie-folk" group that includes her on harp and lead vocals, husband Jeff Mueller on upright bass, and sister Mary Leibovich on a single drum or doing vocals with a full drummer.

The Royal Furs:  A psychedelic rock band where Ruth is the lead singer and performs with a theremin. Other members include Noel Feldman on drums, Joshua Wright on bass guitar, and Mike Marshall on lead guitar.

In addition, she is a backup singer and guitarist on a Missouri-based Pink Floyd tribute band called Interstellar Overdrive, and tours and collaborates with pianist Merry Ellen Kirk.

Ruth Acuff (Harp group) 
Ruth began performing with a lever harp in 2010, going to a Lyon & Healey pedal harp in 2014.  She has nicknamed the harp "Haru."  She performs original work and does both acoustic and electric performances.

The Royal Furs 
The Royal Furs perform primarily original psychedelic rock music, as well as a few cover versions of popular psychedelic 60's era songs.  She sings and plays theremin for this band.

Former Bands 
From 2008 to 2010 Her and Jeff Mueller performed in a folk band called Rutherford.

Music style 
Her 2013 album, This is the Dream, performed as harpist, was classified as "Indie-folk" with "echoes of Americana...as well as traces of an earthier form of chamber music." The Royal Furs has been described as "...pure 1990s Alternative Nation."

Albums 
Ruth Acuff

Paisley  (CD) – Independent – 2011
Tree  (CD) – Independent – 2012
This is the Dream  (CD) – The Nation of Love – 2013
To the Moon (CD) – The Nation of Love – 2014
We Do (Single) –  The Nation of Love – 2016
Peace (Single) –  The Nation of Love – 2018

The Royal Furs

 Can't Catch Me (EP) – 2016
 Fever Dream (CD) –  2016

References

External links 
 Bandcamp website 
 Record Label site
 Television performance on KOMU NBC
 Radio Interview on Blog Talk Radio
Vox Magazine (March 7, 2019) Ruth Acuff is your everyday rock star

Year of birth missing (living people)
Living people
American harpists
American women singer-songwriters
21st-century American women singers
21st-century American singers